Billy McDevitt (5 January 1898–1966) was a Northern Irish footballer who played as a central defender and later managed several teams. Originally playing in Northern Ireland for Belfast United, he joined Liverpool FC in the early 1920s, before moving to Exeter City FC in 1925. He was player-manager and later manager at Exeter, leading the club to the quarterfinals of the 1930–31 FA Cup. He returned to Northern Ireland in the 1930s and managed several Irish Football League clubs, including Belfast Celtic. He died in 1966.

References

1898 births
Year of death missing
Irish association footballers (before 1923)
Liverpool F.C. players
Glentoran F.C. players
Swansea City A.F.C. players
Exeter City F.C. players

Association football midfielders